Kau Sai San Tsuen is a village in the Hebe Haven area of Sai Kung District, Hong Kong.

Administration
Fat Tau Chau is a recognized village under the New Territories Small House Policy.

History
In 1952, Hakka farmers and shopkeepers of Kau Sai Chau were required to relocate, because the place was located in the centre of a large area of sea about to be designated as a military firing range. The villagers were resited to Kau Sai San Tsuen. At the time of the relocation, the village was described as "a new village of 17 houses, family temple, school hall, pigsties, grass-stores and latrine".

References

External links

 Delineation of area of existing village Kau Sai San Tsuen (Sai Kung) for election of resident representative (2019 to 2022)

Villages in Sai Kung District, Hong Kong